The 1985 State of Origin series was the fourth time the annual three-match series between New South Wales and Queensland was contested entirely under 'state of origin' selection rules. It was the year that New South Wales finally ended Queensland's dominance which had arisen with the State of Origin concept.


Games

Game I
Queensland centre Gene Miles was ruled out of State of Origin due to a knee injury.

Heavy rain confronted the players at Lang Park when the teams took the field for the opening match of the series, and it was thought players new to Origin football such as Michael O'Connor might struggle to cope with the conditions. However the former Wallaby displayed nerves of steel to complete one of Origin's most memorable debuts scoring two tries and kicking five goals to finish with all 18 of the Blue's points.

The relentless Blues defence led by Steve Roach, Pat Jarvis and Peter Wynn continually repelled the Maroons and helped keep the Blues line intact for the first time at Origin level. Five-eighth Brett Kenny earned wide praise for his efforts opposite Wally Lewis who was subjected to merciless pressure for almost the entire match. New coach Terry Fearnley and his captain Steve Mortimer had plotted for months to uncover a secret factor that would bring an end to the Maroons' Origin stranglehold.  The strategy was to heap pressure on Lewis, Queensland's five-eighth and playmaker and the Blues carried out the plan perfectly.

Game II

With history possibly in the making a large New South Wales home crowd turned out in wet conditions at the Sydney Cricket Ground. The match was played on a knife's edge when after the Blues had taken a 12–0 lead with two tries after only 16 minutes, Queensland struck back in typical style and took a 14–12 lead despite having lost Bob Lindner and Colin Scott with serious injuries.

The New South Wales forwards relentlessly hurled themselves at the Queensland defence until cracks slowly began to appear. A penalty goal and then a sharply taken field goal by O'Connor gave the Blues a 15–14 lead and then when Lewis attempted to level the scores with his own field goal attempt eight minutes from the end, Mortimer flew from the ruck to charge down the kick.

It was the inspiration the Blues needed and when five-eighth Brett Kenny dashed over for the decisive try a minute from full-time, it sparked scenes of jubilation among the New South Wales players. Broadcast images that now form part of Origin folklore captured a rapturous Mortimer chaired from the field and then falling to the ground full of emotion and pride in the Blues' historic first series victory.

Game III

Queensland took the field in Game III determined to avoid a whitewash but also smarting from a national selection controversy. Blues coach Terry Fearnley was also the Australian national coach and the match was played after the Australia v New Zealand Test series that year. Fearnley had dropped four players, all of them Maroons after the second Test. The Kiwis went on to win the third test 18–0, the first time the Australian's had been held scoreless in a test match since 1956.

Queensland came out breathing fire and as the score mounted, late in the game Maroons forward Greg Dowling, one of the players axed by Fearnley, left the field replaced and stopped by the Blues bench to give Fearnley a passionate serve and tirade of abuse. Following this event ARL officials would legislate that the national coach never be a serving Origin coach to avoid the possibility of such embarrassing scenes or the potential for claims of bias.

Teams

New South Wales
With the departure of Frank Stanton, Terry Fearnley was brought in to coach the New South Wales side.

Queensland
With the departure of Arthur Beetson, 1984 Brisbane Rugby League season-winning Wynnum Manly Seagulls coach, Des Morris was brought in to coach Queensland for the 1985 series.

See also
1985 Winfield Cup

Sources

Footnotes
 Big League's 25 Years of Origin Collectors' Edition, News Magazines, Surry Hills, Sydney

External links
State of Origin 1985 at rugbyleagueproject.org

State of Origin series
State of Origin series